Fargone Beauties is an Australian Country music band. Their single "Wild Thing" had national airplay and was on high rotation on many regional radio stations. The played a cover of "Stairway to Heaven" on The Money or the Gun and appeared on the Breaking Ground - New Directions in Country Music compilation which was nominated for a 1991 ARIA Award for Best Country Album. They were nominated for a Golden guitar in 1994 for their song "Single Drop".

Band members
John Spence - Guitar, Vocals
James Gillard - Bass, Vocals
Terry Murray - Guitar, Vocals
Mark Marriott - Drums
Tommy Emmanuel - Drums
Doug Bligh - Drums
Mark Meyer - Drums
Dave Druery - Drums
Mark Collins - Banjo
Ian Simpson - Banjo
Daryl Melbourne - Banjo/dobro

Discography

Albums

Awards

Mo Awards
The Australian Entertainment Mo Awards (commonly known informally as the Mo Awards), were annual Australian entertainment industry awards. They recognise achievements in live entertainment in Australia from 1975 to 2016. They won 3 awards in that time.
 (wins only)
|-
| 1992
| Fargone Beauties
| Country Group of the Year
| 
|-
| 1993
| Fargone Beauties
| Country Group of the Year
| 
|-
| 1994
| Fargone Beauties
| Country Group of the Year
| 
|-

References

Australian country music groups